Cholila, Argentina is a town located in Cushamen Department, Chubut Province, Argentina. It is located in Patagonia. The population of the town in 2010 was 1,560 and its elevation above sea level was  Cholila is located a few hundred meters from  Pellegrini Lake, also called Lago de los Mosquitos,  in surface area. Cholila sits at the foot of the Andes.

Climate
Cholila has a Csb climate (Mediterranean temperate, warm dry summers, cool wet winters) by the Köppen climate classification system. The climate is classified as Cslk (Mediterranean temperate, mild summers, cool winters) by the Trewartha climate classification.

Butch Cassidy

The American outlaw Butch Cassidy, his partner, the Sundance Kid, and Sundance's girl friend Etta Place bought a ranch near Cholila in 1901 and lived there until about 1905. In 2007, the cabin was partially restored. Cassidy, Sundance, and Place bought a  ranch near Cholila and raised sheep, cattle, and horses. They were apparently forced to sell the ranch and flee because Pinkerton detectives discovered their location. They were tipped off by a local sheriff that Pinkerton agents  were coming for them.

References

Populated places in Chubut Province
Butch Cassidy's Wild Bunch